Nowy Młyn , German Neumühle,  is a hamlet in the administrative district of Gmina Strzeleczki (Gemeinde Klein Strehlitz), within Krapkowice County, Opole Voivodeship, in south-western Poland.

Since 2006 the village, along with the entire commune, has been bilingual in German and Polish.

The village has a population of 120 people. It is administered as part of the village of Komorniki (Komornik).

History
The village's name was first recorded in 1783, when there were 26 people living there. It comes from the mill that was located in the village ("Neumühle" and "Nowy Młyn" both meaning "new mill").

References

Villages in Krapkowice County